Miroirs (French for "Mirrors") is a five-movement suite for solo piano written by French composer Maurice Ravel between 1904 and 1905. First performed by Ricardo Viñes in 1906, Miroirs contains five movements, each dedicated to a fellow member of the French avant-garde artist group Les Apaches.

History
Around 1900, Maurice Ravel joined a group of innovative young artists, poets, critics, and musicians referred to as Les Apaches or "hooligans", a term coined by Ricardo Viñes to refer to his band of "artistic outcasts". To pay tribute to his fellow artists, Ravel began composing Miroirs in 1904 and finished it the following year. It was first published by Eugène Demets in 1906. The third and fourth movements were subsequently orchestrated by Ravel, while the fifth was orchestrated by Percy Grainger, among others.

Structure

Miroirs has five movements, each dedicated to a member of Les Apaches:

Orchestrated versions

"Une barque sur l'océan" and "Alborada del gracioso" were orchestrated by Ravel himself. "La vallée des cloches" has been orchestrated by Ernesto Halffter for triple woodwind, four horns, timpani, percussion, two harps, celesta and strings; and by Percy Grainger for a typical Grainger ensemble with multiple pianos and percussion, plus strings. The earliest known orchestration of "Noctuelles" is by the British pianist Michael Round, an orchestration commissioned by Vladimir Ashkenazy and recorded by him with the NHK Symphony Orchestra (Exxon, 1993) – the recording also includes Round's scorings of the Fugue and Toccata from Le Tombeau de Couperin. In orchestrated form "Noctuelles" is scored for triple woodwind (including E clarinet) minus one contrabassoon; four horns, three trumpets, three trombones and tuba, timpani, percussion, two harps, celesta and strings. There is a more recent orchestration (2001) of "Noctuelles" by American composer Steven Stucky. It is published by Theodore Presser Company and is scored for 3 flutes (3rd doubling piccolo), 3 oboes (3rd doubling English horn), 2 clarinets, 3 bassoons (3rd doubling contrabassoon), 4 horns, 3 trumpets, 3 trombones, tuba, timpani, 2 percussionists, celesta, two harps, and strings. In 2001 American conductor Leif Bjaland orchestrated "Oiseaux tristes" scored for 2 flutes, 2 oboes, English horn, 2 clarinets, bass clarinet, 2 bassoons, 4 horns, harp, and strings. In 2003 the British composer Simon Clarke made an orchestration of the three movements that Ravel did not orchestrate.

See also
List of compositions by Maurice Ravel

References

External links

Recording of Miroirs, performed by Thérèse Dussaut, in MP3 format:
"Noctuelles"
"Oiseaux tristes"
"Une barque sur l'océan"
"Alborada del gracioso"
"La vallée des cloches"
Recording of Miroirs, performed by Felipe Sarro: Archive.org

Suites by Maurice Ravel
1905 compositions
Compositions for solo piano
Music with dedications